Baldia railway station (Sindhi: بلديه ريلوي اسٽيشن) is located in Karachi, Pakistan.

See also
 List of railway stations in Pakistan
 Pakistan Railways

References

Railway stations in Karachi
Railway stations on Karachi Circular Railway
Baldia Town